The 1922–23 season was the 28th season of competitive football by Southampton, and the club's first in the Second Division of the Football League. Having secured promotion from the Third Division South as champions the previous season, the largely unchanged Saints team avoided relegation comfortably and finished in the middle of the league table in their first season as a second-flight club. After a poor start to the campaign in which they picked up only one point from their first five matches, Southampton began to improve in form and move up from the Second Division relegation zone. The club picked up several wins over higher-placed opponents challenging for the division's two promotion places, allowing them to finish mid-table. Southampton finished in 11th place with 14 wins, 14 draws and 14 losses, and an even goal average.

In the 1922–23 FA Cup, Southampton beat First Division sides Newcastle United and Chelsea in the first and second rounds, followed by Second Division opponents Bury in the third, all of which went to replays at The Dell. In the fourth round they faced West Ham United, another Second Division side, and were knocked out after a second replay. The club ended the season hosting local rivals Portsmouth in the annual Hampshire Benevolent Cup charity match, which ended in a 2–2 draw with goals from Arthur Dominy and Henry Johnson. They also played Pompey a week previously in the Rowland Hospital Cup, with Johnson and Bill Rawlings scoring in the 2–1 win. Southampton also played three friendly matches during the season, losing to Arsenal in October, Portsmouth in December, and drawing at Northampton Town in May.

Southampton used 22 different players during the 1922–23 season and had nine different goalscorers. Their top scorer was inside-right Arthur Dominy, who scored 13 goals in the Second Division and four in the FA Cup. Centre-forward Bill Rawlings, the club's top scorer for the last two seasons, scored 12 times in the league and twice in the cup. Seven new players were signed by the club during the campaign, with five released and sold to other clubs. The average attendance at The Dell during the 1922–23 season was 12,261. The highest attendance was approximately 25,000 in the FA Cup second round replay against Chelsea on 7 February 1923; the highest league attendance was 18,000 against South Shields on 2 September 1922. The lowest attendance of the season was around 5,000 for the game against Port Vale on 5 March 1923.

Background and transfers
At the end of the 1921–22 season, several players left Southampton. First was centre-half George Bradburn, who had been out of favour for the past two seasons due to the continued form of the preferred Alec Campbell. He left to return to Walsall in the Third Division North. In June, outside-left Ken Boyes also left the club, remaining in the Third Division South with Bristol Rovers. Len Butt left around the same time, joining local Southern League club Boscombe. Centre-forward John Horton, who had managed just one appearance in his first season with the Saints before breaking his leg, was forced to retire from professional football. Prior to the start of the 1922–23 campaign, Southampton manager Jimmy McIntyre brought in two new signings to the club. First was Scottish half-back Alex Christie, who joined from Walsall primarily as cover at right-half behind the ever-present Bert Shelley. Also signed was left winger Joe Clark, who joined from Welsh side Aberdare & Aberaman Athletic.

Shortly after the season had begun, McIntyre signed several more players. In September, the club brought in half-back Arthur Bradford from Talbot Stead Tubeworks, although he would not make his debut for the club until late the following season. The club also signed former goalkeeper Herbert Lock from Queens Park Rangers and Harry Yeomans from Camberley & Yorktown, having been without a backup for Tommy Allen the entire last season. In November, inside-forward Les Bruton was brought in from Foleshill for a fee of £15. Southampton signed and sold one more player in January 1923. Leaving the club was Scottish half-back George Getgood, who had joined less than a year earlier and been a regular in the side ever since. Getgood had continued to commute to the South Coast from Birmingham instead of moving, and so decided to transfer to a club closer to home when he joined Wolverhampton Wanderers. Outside-left Willie McCall moved in the other direction as part of the deal.

Players transferred in

Players transferred out

Players retired

Second Division

Southampton's first season in the Second Division of the Football League started poorly, with the club picking up just two points from their opening six games – in a goalless draw against South Shields on opening day, and in a 2–2 draw with Barnsley a month later – to find themselves in the relegation zone early on. The Saints failed to score in their first five games of the campaign, which marked a club record not equalled until 1937. The first home game of the season, against Leeds United, also marked the end of the team's 18-month unbeaten run at home. Southampton picked up their first win over Blackpool on 23 September, and began to improve their form to move up from the bottom of the league table. After a nine-game unbeaten run, the club had made it up to 11th place by mid-November. Despite being briefly dropped in favour of Henry Johnson early in the season, Bill Rawlings scored many important goals in later months alongside Arthur Dominy to ensure that the Saints remained competitive.

The club continued to remain above the drop zone over the Christmas period, despite dropping a number of points in both home and away fixtures, albeit to teams challenging for the division's promotion places. Their biggest defeat of the season came on 9 December at The Dell, with fellow strugglers Derby County thrashing the home side 4–0. By the new year they had cemented their position in the middle of the table, beating teams in the same vicinity such as Hull City and Fulham in late December to move back up to 11th. Another brief unbeaten run against lower-placed teams in March and April was followed by wins over strugglers Clapton Orient and Stockport County, which ensured that the side survived their first season in the Second Division with relative ease. Southampton finished the season in 11th place, picking up 14 wins, 14 draws and 14 losses. With a goal record of 40 scored and 40 conceded, they finished ahead of Hull City on goal average, and trailed 10th-placed Fulham by two points.

List of match results

Final league table

Results by matchday

FA Cup

Southampton entered the 1922–23 FA Cup in the first round against Newcastle United, a well-established First Division side who were challenging for the title. According to club historians, "Few people gave Southampton a chance at St James' Park" in the 13 January 1923 game, but the team "fought the muddy battle well" to hold the top-flight side to a goalless draw; goalkeeper Tommy Allen was credited for his performance in particular. In the replay at home four days later, the Saints played "some of the best football ever seen at The Dell" to win 3–1 (despite conceding in the opening minute), with goals coming from Arthur Dominy (two) and Bill Rawlings. The second round match also pitted Second Division Southampton against a First Division club – this time strugglers Chelsea at Stamford Bridge – and also ended in a goalless draw. The tie again saw a replay scheduled at The Dell, which the Saints won in front of a season high attendance of 25,000 thanks to another goal from Dominy.

The pattern of results continued in the third round, as Bury and Southampton competed a goalless draw at Gigg Lane on 24 February. Again, it took a home replay for the Saints to beat the Shakers, which they did with another single goal from Arthur Dominy. In the fourth round, Southampton hosted fellow Second Division side West Ham United, who were then in fourth place in the table. Vic Watson scored for the visitors early on, but a "clever header" from Jack Elkes secured a 1–1 draw and forced at replay at Upton Park ten days later. The replay also ended 1–1, with Bill Rawlings scoring for the Saints. A second replay took place on 19 March at Villa Park, the home of top-flight club Aston Villa, in which the Hammers scored the only goal to advance to the semi-finals. Southampton brought in a total of £28,482 in FA Cup receipts, around £4,000 of which was used to improve the facilities at The Dell. West Ham later made it to the 1923 FA Cup Final, the first to be played at Wembley Stadium.

Other matches
Outside of the league and the FA Cup, Southampton played five additional first-team matches during the 1922–23 season. The first was a friendly match against First Division side Arsenal on 16 October 1922, which was a benefit for centre-half Alec Campbell. The high-scoring game ended in a 5–3 win for the Gunners, with the Saints scoring through Bill Rawlings (twice) and Arthur Dominy. The second friendly of the season was another benefit game – this time for long-serving manager Jimmy McIntyre – at home to local rivals Portsmouth in December. The visitors won the game 3–1 through goals from Dave Watson, Jerry Mackie and Alfred Strange, with Rawlings scoring the only goal for the Saints, who were described by the Southampton Times as displaying a "don't care attitude" towards the game.

Southampton and Portsmouth met again on 16 April 1923 in the first competition of the Rowland Hospital Cup, introduced to help raise money for hospitals in the local area. Played at Fratton Park, the game ended in a 2–1 win to the Second Division side, with the visitors' goals coming in the first half courtesy of Henry Johnson and Bill Rawlings. The game's quality was praised by commentators, who claimed that "It could not have been a more stirring game had the two clubs been fighting at the top of the same league". The sides met for a third time the following week, drawing 2–2 in the Hampshire Benevolent Cup. Pompey led through a Tom Parker own goal and a strike from Mackie, before the Saints responded through Johnson and Dominy. On 3 May, the Saints drew 2–2 with Northampton Town.

Player details
Southampton manager Jimmy McIntyre used 22 different players during the 1922–23 season, nine of whom scored during the campaign. The team played in a 2–3–5 formation throughout the campaign, with two full-backs, three half-backs, two outside forwards, two inside forwards and a centre-forward. Only one player – right-half Bert Shelley – appeared in all 51 league and FA Cup matches. Inside-right Arthur Dominy played in all but two league matches during the season, and centre-half Bill Turner appeared in all except three. Dominy finished as the club's top scorer for the season, with 13 goals in the league and five in the cups. Bill Rawlings scored 12 goals in the league and three in the cups. Alec Campbell, George Getgood and Shelley were the club's only scoring half-backs of the season, with just one league goal each.

Squad statistics

Most appearances

Top goalscorers

Footnotes

References

Bibliography

External links
Southampton F.C. official website

Southampton F.C. seasons
Southampton